St Marys was an electoral district of the Legislative Assembly in the Australian state of New South Wales from 1981 to 1988 and 1991 to 1999, which included the suburb of St Marys and replaced Mount Druitt. It was abolished in 1999.

Members for St Marys

Election results

References

Former electoral districts of New South Wales
1981 establishments in Australia
Constituencies established in 1981
1988 disestablishments in Australia
Constituencies disestablished in 1988
1991 establishments in Australia
Constituencies established in 1991
1999 disestablishments in Australia
Constituencies disestablished in 1999